Crossroads Christian Communications is a Canadian non-profit charitable corporation located in Burlington, Ontario, Canada. 100 Huntley Street, the flagship television program of Crossroads was founded by Rev. David Mainse and is the longest running daily Christian television program in Canada.  Crossroads interacts with its viewers via 24/7 prayer lines, and it has also been a not-for-profit aid agency for over 25 years, having responded in times of natural disaster worldwide, raising funds and partnering with on-site, non-government organizations for emergency relief and long-term rebuilding strategies.

Media Group

Broadcasting and distribution
 Yes TV
 Calgary - CKCS
 Edmonton - CKES
 Hamilton/Greater Toronto Area - CITS
 Ottawa - CITS-1
 London - CITS-2
 Crossroads eStore
 Tricord Media
 Castle

TV and online broadcasts
 100 Huntley Street
 Circle Square (1974–1986 television program for children)
 Context Beyond the Headlines (with Maggie John)
 See Hear Love (with Melinda Estabrooks)
 A Better Us (with Ron and Ann Mainse)
 Young Once
 100 Words by David Mainse

Ministries
 24/7 Prayer Center
 Relief and Development

References

Christian mass media in Canada
Television broadcasting companies of Canada
Companies based in Burlington, Ontario
Christian missions
Non-profit organizations based in Ontario
Mass media companies established in 1962
1962 establishments in Ontario